Philip Kotler (born May 27, 1931) is an American marketing author, consultant, and professor emeritus;  the S. C. Johnson & Son Distinguished Professor of International Marketing at the Kellogg School of Management at Northwestern University (1962–2018). He is known for popularizing the definition of marketing mix. He is the author of over 80 books, including Marketing Management, Principles of Marketing, Kotler on Marketing, Marketing Insights from A to Z, Marketing 4.0, Marketing Places, Marketing of Nations, Chaotics, Market Your Way to Growth, Winning Global Markets, Strategic Marketing for Health Care Organizations, Social Marketing, Social Media Marketing, My Adventures in Marketing, Up and Out of Poverty, and Winning at Innovation. Kotler describes strategic marketing as serving as "the link between society's needs and its pattern of industrial response."

Kotler helped create the field of social marketing that focuses on helping individuals and groups modify their behaviors toward healthier and safer living styles. He also created the concept of "demarketing" to aid in the task of reducing the level of demand. He also developed the concepts of "prosumers," "atmospherics," and "societal marketing." He is regarded as "The Father of Modern Marketing" by many scholars.

Kotler's latest work focuses on economic justice and the shortcomings of capitalism. He published Confronting Capitalism: Real Solutions for a Troubled Economic System in 2015, Democracy in Decline: Rebuilding its Future in 2016, "Advancing the Common Good" in 2019, and Brand Activism: From Purpose to Action in 2018.

Early life
Kotler's parents, Betty and Maurice, emigrated from Ukraine and Russia as teenagers and settled in Chicago. Kotler was the eldest of their three sons, born in Chicago on May 27, 1931. He studied at DePaul University for two years and was accepted without a bachelor's degree into the Master's program at the University of Chicago (1953) and completed his PhD at Massachusetts Institute of Technology (1956), earning both degrees in economics. He studied under three Nobel Laureates in Economic Science: Milton Friedman, Paul Samuelson, and Robert Solow. He did a year of postdoctoral work in mathematics at Harvard University (1960) and in behavioral science at the University of Chicago (1961).

Views about marketing

Kotler started teaching marketing in 1962 at the Kellogg School of Management, Northwestern University.  He believed marketing was an essential part of economics and saw demand as influenced not only by price but also by advertising, sales promotions, sales forces, direct mail, and various middlemen (agents, retailers, wholesalers, etc.) operating as sales and distribution channels.

Philip Kotler holds that: 
"the organization's marketing task is to determine the needs, wants and interests of target markets and to achieve the desired results more effectively and efficiently than competitors, in a way that preserves or enhances the consumer's or society's well-being."  

He links the profit motive to the satisfaction of consumer wants and society's well-being. In order to market effectively, Kotler believes the marketing purpose of elevating consumer well-being has to be put at the heart of company strategy and be practiced by all managers.

In 2003, the Financial Times cited Kotler's three major contributions to marketing and to management:

First, he has done more than any other writer or scholar to promote the importance of marketing, transforming it from a peripheral activity, bolted on to the more "important" work of production.  Second, he continued a trend started by Peter Drucker, shifting emphasis away from price and distribution to a greater focus on meeting customers' needs and on the benefits received from a product or service. Third, he has broadened the concept of marketing from more selling to a general process of communication and exchange, and has shown how marketing can be extended and applied to charities, museums, performing arts organizations, political parties and many other non-commercial situations.

Kotler argued for "broadening the field of marketing" to cover not only commercial operations but also the operations of non-profit organizations and government agencies.  He held that marketing can be applied not only to products, services, and experiences, but also to causes, ideas, persons, and places. Thus a museum needs the marketing skills of Product, Price, Place, and Promotion (the 4P's) if it is to be successful in attracting visitors, donors, staff members, and public support. Kotler and Gerald Zaltman created the field of social marketing, which applies marketing theory to influence behavior change that would benefit consumers, their peers, and society as a whole.  Kotler and Sidney Levy developed the idea of demarketing, which organizations must employ to reduce overall or selective demand when demand is too high.  Thus, when water is in short supply, the government needs to persuade various water consumers to reduce water usage so that enough water will be available for essential uses. In 2018, Christian Sarkar and Kotler began promoting brand activism, the idea that businesses must go beyond Corporate Social Responsibility to tackle the world's most urgent problems.

Writings and activities
In 1967, Kotler published Marketing Management: Analysis, Planning, and Control, now in its 15th edition,{2016} and the world's most widely adopted textbook in graduate schools of business. Whereas previous marketing textbooks were highly descriptive, this text was the first to draw on economic science, organizational theory, psychology of behavior and choice, and analytics.  It described theory and practice, and drew on findings from empirical studies and cases. On December 9, 1996, the Financial Times cited Marketing Management as one of the 50 greatest business books of all time {December 9, 1996}

Kotler is the author and co-author of over 166 published articles and 80 books. 

Kotler has also written books on such subjects as corporate social responsibility, education, environment, government marketing, healthcare, hospitality, innovation, museums, performing arts, place marketing, poverty alleviation, professional services, religious institutions, tourism, capitalism, and democracy.

Kotler was invited to be the first Legend in Marketing. His published articles are presented, analyzed, and commented on in the nine-volume Legends in Marketing Series: Philip Kotler, edited by Professor Jagdish Sheth {2012}

In 2014, he started a blog on fixcapitalism.com that featured many articles on making capitalism work better for more people.

In 2016, he co-founded (with Christian Sarkar) The Marketing Journal, an online site dedicated to sharing insights and next practices in marketing.

In 2017, Kotler published his autobiography - My Adventures in Marketing, an account of his experiences from his formative years to the present, including his views on topics such as demarketing, brand activism, marketing of the arts, place marketing, as well as the challenges facing capitalism, democracy, and the common good.

In 2018, Kotler co-founded a think tank with futurist David Houle and Jason Voss called The Sarasota Institute.  The TSI sponsors public meetings and publishes peer-reviewed articles in ten areas: Technology, Public Policy, Natural Resources, Marketing and Media, Intelligence, Health Care, Education, Democracy, Climate Change, and Economics.

In 2018, with Christian Sarkar, he co-founded ActivistBrands.com, an online resource on progressive brand activism.

In 2019, Christian Sarkar and Kotler began an open-source project to model the world's most urgent problems.  The Wicked7 Project aims to create an online movement of individuals and institutions interested in finding "virtuous solutions" to pressing wicked problems.

In 2021, Kotler co-founded the Regenerative Marketing Institute with Enrico Foglia and Christian Sarkar.

Honorable distinctions
In 1975, Kotler was the first person to receive the "Leader in Marketing Thought" award voted on by the academic members of the American Marketing Association.

The Financial Times on November 18, 2005 surveyed 1,000 executives in 25 countries about the Most Influential Business Writers/Management Gurus, and Kotler ranked fourth after Peter Drucker, Bill Gates, and Jack Welch. Kotler's contributions are described in at least one chapter found in every book written about the "gurus" of business and management (see References below).

In 2007, Kotler was appointed a special Ambassador at large for Indonesian Tourism. In May 2011, the city of Denpasar in Bali bestowed the title of honorary resident of Denpasar.

On February 16, 2013, he was the first recipient of the William L. Wilkie "Marketing for a Better World" award from the American Marketing Association to "honor marketers who have significantly contributed to the understanding and appreciation for marketing's potential to improve the world." Also, in 2013 he was the first recipient of the Sheth Foundation Medal for Exceptional Contribution to Marketing Scholarship and Practice.

On November 7, 2013, Kotler received the Badge of Honor of Officer of the Order of Academic Palms established in France in the 19th Century.

On November 19, 2013, Kotler was inducted into the Management Hall of Fame, along with 10 other management gurus.

On March 1, 2014, Kotler is number 16 in the list of the 30 World's Top Management Professionals and the only marketer.

On May 28, 2014, Kotler is inducted in the Marketing Hall of Fame in New York City.

On April 23, 2016, Kotler received the Lifetime Achievement Award from the Leaders International at the 6th Global Leadership Awards.

In 2020, Kotler was voted the #3 Guru in Management in the top 30 Gurus of Management.

Kotler is also the founder (2011) along with Fahim Kibria of the World Marketing Summit. WMS sponsors global conferences with top speakers discussing the latest developments in marketing and business practice that will improve commerce and the quality of life. He also established with Hermawan Kartajaya the world's first Museum of Marketing (3.0) in Ubud, Bali, Indonesia.

Kotler is a collector of fine Japanese netsukes and swordguards. He and his wife Nancy are major collectors of studio art glass. They contributed a major portion of their glass collection to the Ringling Museum of Art in Sarasota, Florida. The Kotlers and the Covilles funded the Glass Pavilion building at the museum.

Kotler has received 22 honorary degrees from around the world (at Academy of Economic Studies in Bucharest, Athens School of Economics, BI Norwegian School of Management, Budapest School of Economic Science and Public Administration, Catholic University Santo Domingo, DePaul University, Cracow School of Economics, Groupe HEC, HHL Graduate School of Management, Iliria University, Istanbul Ticaret University, La Sapienza University, Mackenzie University, Mediterranean University, National University of Kyiv Mohyla Academy, Nyenrode Business University, Plekhanov Russian Academy of Economics, Universidad Americana, Universidad del Pacifico, University American College, University of Bucharest, University of Stockholm, and University of Zurich).

Family 
Philip has two brothers, Milton and the late Neil Kotler.  Philip met Nancy at Radcliffe (Harvard) and they married in 1955.  They have three daughters, Amy, Melissa and Jessica and nine grandchildren.

Kotler Board of Impact 
Philip started a strategic marketing community to ensure marketing and economic progress through diversity. As a part of this initiative, every year Marketing Summits and Conferences are held across the world that acts as a potpourri of young minds. In India, the board works with Niti Ayog and the project is spearheaded by Dr. Somdutta Singh.

Selected publications 
"Guru" books that contain a complete chapter on Professor Kotler's contributions include such titles as:
 
 
 
 
 Kotler, Philip, Garcia-Garcia Manuel, & Cerf, Moran (2017). Consumer Neuroscience. MIT Press.

References

Further reading
 “What Next?” – An Interview with Philip Kotler on the Future of Marketing" (The Marketing Journal), January 15, 2016
 “Phil Kotler on the Relationship between Marketing and Capitalism" (FIXCapitalism.com)
 “Can Marketing Improve Capitalism?" (Huffington Post)
 “Finally, Brand Activism!” – Philip Kotler and Christian Sarkar (The Marketing Journal), January 9, 2017

External links

 PKotler.org

1931 births
American business theorists
American business writers
American economics writers
American male non-fiction writers
Fellows of the American Marketing Association
Harvard University alumni
University of Chicago alumni
MIT School of Humanities, Arts, and Social Sciences alumni
Living people
Marketing theorists
Marketing people
American marketing people
American people of Ukrainian descent
Kellogg School of Management faculty
DePaul University alumni
Business educators